Gyretes iricolor is a species of whirligig beetle in the family Gyrinidae. It is found in North America.

References

Further reading

 
 
 

Gyrinidae
Articles created by Qbugbot
Beetles described in 1947